Sanford Barringer Steever (fl. 2000) is an American linguist specializing in Dravidian languages.

Selected publications 
 1988  The Serial Verb Formation in the Dravidian Languages. (MLBD series in linguistics, 4) Delhi: Motilal Banarsidass.
 1993  Synthesis to Analysis. New York: Oxford University Press.
 1998  The Dravidian Languages (Routledge Language Family Descriptions) London: Routledge.
 2005 The Tamil auxiliary verb system. London: Routledge.

References

Year of birth missing (living people)
Living people
Linguists from the United States
Dravidologists